Elsie Anna-Lena Lodenius (born June 30, 1958 in Norrtälje, Stockholm) is a Swedish journalist, author and lecturer. She is best known for her studies of autonomous extreme nationalist movements and right-wing populism. She has published articles in Expressen, Aftonbladet, Svenska Dagbladet, Dagens Nyheter, Ordfront, Månadsjournalen and Arena.

Lodenius was appointed as a researcher and reporter for investigative television programs such as TV4's Kalla fakta and SVT's Striptease. She also participated in a series of TV and radio programs such as Mosaik and UR's UR-akademin.

From 200304 she worked at the Olof Palme International Centre on an information project called "Global Respect". From 2018 she is in the board and the editorial of Doku, a foundation for investigating radical jihadism.

Bibliography 
Operation högervridning (with Sven Ove Hansson), Tiden förlag, 1988
Extremhögern (with Stieg Larsson), Tiden förlag (revised edition 1994), 1991
Nazist, rasist eller bara patriot? En bok om den rasistiska ungdomskulturen och främlingsfientligt orienterad brottslighet (with Per Wikström), Rikspolisstyrelsen, 1997
Vit makt och blågula drömmar: Rasism och nazism i dagens Sverige (with Per Wikström), Natur & Kultur, 1998
Svenskarna först: Handbok mot rasism och främlingsfientlighet (with ), Atlas förlag, 1999
Tvåfrontskrig: Fackets kamp mot nazism och kommunism, Hjalmarsson och Högberg, 2002
Global Respekt  grundkurs i globalisering och mänskliga rättigheter (2005; English translation) (editor, Premiss förlag), 2004
Är det värt det?  om handel och mänskliga rättigheter (editor, Rättvisemärkt och Rena Kläder), 2005
Gatans parlament  om politiska våldsverkare i Sverige (Ordfront, presented in TV4 Morgon August 9, 2006), 2006
Migrantarbetare  grundkurs om rörlighet, rättigheter och globalisering (with Mats Wingborg), (Premiss förlag), 2008
Slaget om svenskheten  ta debatten med Sverigedemokraterna (with Mats Wingborg), (Premiss förlag/Arena Idé), 2009
Krutdurk Europa (with Mats Wingborg), (Bilda förlag), 2011
Vi säger vad du tänker - högerpopulismen i Europa, (Atlas förlag), 2015
Vi måste förbereda oss på död - i huvudet på en terrorist, (Atlas förlag), 2017

References

External links 
 

1958 births
People from Norrtälje
Academics and writers on far-right extremism
Living people
Swedish women writers
Swedish journalists
Swedish-language writers
Women political scientists